Hot Millions is a 1968 British caper story feature film made by MGM. It was directed by Eric Till and produced by Mildred Freed Alberg, from a collaborative screenplay by Ira Wallach and star Peter Ustinov. The music score was composed by Laurie Johnson, featuring the single "This Time" by Scottish singer Lulu. The cinematographer was Kenneth Higgins.

Plot
Con artist Marcus Pendleton has just been released from prison for embezzlement. He has emerged into a world increasingly reliant on computers. He convinces computer programmer Caesar Smith to follow his lifelong dream of hunting moths in the Amazon Rainforest. Assuming Caesar's identity, he gains employment at the London offices of an American conglomerate called Tacanco. While Pendleton fools executive vice president Carlton Klemper, another Tacanco executive, vice president Willard Gnatpole, is suspicious. As Caesar Smith, Pendleton uses the company's computer systems to send claim cheques to himself under various aliases and addresses all over Europe. For his Paris company, the cheques go to 'Claude Debussy' and his cheques to Italy go to 'Gioachino Rossini', both famous (but conveniently dead) composers.  He meets and marries Patty, an inept secretary and frustrated flautist. As Caesar, he now has the problem of hiding his hot money. Beating discovery of his fraud by Gnatpole, he and Patty flee to Brazil when Klemper and Gnatpole fly to Rio after Patty invited them. In a twist, it seems that a now-heavily pregnant Patty found the loose change from his foreign visits money and invested it in the companies that Pendleton mumbled about in his sleep, thus actually making a profit for Tacanco. Patty offers to sell the inflated stock back at a reduced price, repaying all the money stolen by her husband with the profits from the stock sale.  She also explains her desire to have the baby back in England and so contacted Klemper and Gnatpole to 'visit'. She then persuades Klemper to rehire Pendleton as Taranco's treasurer, since as it was his genius that created the fraud, he would be the best one to spot them and that he would not steal from his own company. Pendleton, though unhappy with his new legal status, agrees. The film ends with Pendleton conducting an orchestra (one of his dreams) and Gnatpole and Klemper as the audience. Patty, still in advanced pregnancy, is the solo flautist. As she finishes her solo, she realizes that the baby is on the way, to which a concerned Pendleton whispers, "What... now?"

Cast
 Peter Ustinov as Marcus Pendleton / Caesar Smith
 Maggie Smith as Patty Terwilliger Smith
 Karl Malden as Carlton J. Klemper
 Bob Newhart as Willard C. Gnatpole
 Robert Morley as Caesar Smith
 Cesar Romero as Customs Inspector
 Lynda Baron as Louise the Waitress (uncredited)

Locations
Filmed at MGM-British Studios, Borehamwood, Hertfordshire, England, and on location.

When Maggie Smith's character takes Bob Newhart's character shopping, she is seen buying an outfit at the Apple Boutique on Baker Street, London, which was owned by the Beatles. The boutique only operated for a few months before closing; Hot Millions provides one of the few filmed glimpses of its interior.

The car driven by Newhart’s character is a Jensen Interceptor.

Reception
The film was loss-making but was moderately budgeted.

Awards
The film was nominated for an Oscar in 1969 for Best Writing, Story and Screenplay - Written Directly for the Screen and for a Writers Guild of America award for Best Written American Comedy.

References

External links
 
 
 
 
 

1968 films
1960s crime comedy films
1960s heist films
British crime comedy films
British heist films
Films about computing
Films about con artists
Films directed by Eric Till
Films scored by Laurie Johnson
Films set in London
Films shot in England
Metro-Goldwyn-Mayer films
1968 comedy films
Films shot at MGM-British Studios
1960s English-language films
1960s British films